Carmen Bunaciu (born 15 September 1961) is a retired Romanian swimmer who won four bronze medals in the 100 m and 200 m backstroke at the European and World Championships of 1977–1982. She also competed in these events at the 1980 and 1984 Summer Olympics and finished fourth three times.

During her career she won 70 national titles and set 39 national records; as of 2012, her record in the 50 m butterfly set in 1986 remained unbeaten. Her bronze medal in 1982 was the first Romanian swimming title at World Championships.

In 1968 she started swimming in the CSS Sibiu club, and in 1974 moved to Bucharest to study in a boarding school. In 1977, she became the first Romanian female athlete to swim 100 m within one minute.

After retirement from senior swimming in 1986 she worked as a swimming coach at Dinamo București, the club where she trained for 12 years. Between 1989 and 1992 she was also the head coach of the national team. She still swims daily, but does not compete due to problems with her back.

References

1961 births
Living people
Sportspeople from Sibiu
Swimmers at the 1980 Summer Olympics
Swimmers at the 1984 Summer Olympics
Olympic swimmers of Romania
Romanian female backstroke swimmers
World Aquatics Championships medalists in swimming
European Aquatics Championships medalists in swimming
Universiade medalists in swimming
Universiade gold medalists for Romania
Universiade silver medalists for Romania
Universiade bronze medalists for Romania
Medalists at the 1979 Summer Universiade
Medalists at the 1981 Summer Universiade
Medalists at the 1983 Summer Universiade
Medalists at the 1985 Summer Universiade
Romanian female butterfly swimmers